is a Japanese professional golfer.

Early life and amateur career
Sonoda was born in Tokyo. He was first trained by his father. After that he has been taught by golf teaching pro, Todd Baker, since he was 10 years old. When Sonoda visited Gold Coast, Australia with his family at age 13, he decided to study in Gold Coast because the town has many golf courses. He spent two years in a junior high school there to pursue his golf game further. He won the Japan National Junior Golf Championship. He decided to return Japan to enter the Suginami-Gakuin High School. He was a high school teammate of Ryo Ishikawa. Ishikawa calls him "King" as he swept all the junior tournaments. They first met in elementary school. In his sophomore year at the Meiji University, he qualified for Japan Golf Tour.

Professional career
Sonoda began playing on the Japan Golf Tour in 2010 and won the 2010 Gateway to the Open Mizuno Open Yomiuri Classic. This victory earned him an exemption into the 2010 Open Championship.

Professional wins (3)

Japan Golf Tour wins (2)

*Note: The 2010 Gateway to The Open Mizuno Open Yomiuri Classic was shortened to 54 holes due to rain.

Japan Golf Tour playoff record (0–2)

Other wins (1)
2008 Sponichi Cup (as an amateur)

Results in major championships

CUT = missed the half-way cut
"T" = tied

Results in World Golf Championships

"T" = Tied

Team appearances
Amateur
Eisenhower Trophy (representing Japan): 2008

Professional
Royal Trophy (representing Asia): 2011

References

External links

Japanese male golfers
Japan Golf Tour golfers
Sportspeople from Tokyo
1989 births
Living people